John Factor (October 8, 1892 – January 22, 1984), born Iakov Faktorowicz and widely known as Jake "The Barber" Factor, was a Prohibition-era gangster and con artist affiliated with the Chicago Outfit.

Biography
Factor was born Iakov Faktorowicz on October 8, 1892, in Łódź, Congress Poland, to Avrum (Abraham) Iakov Faktorowicz and his wife, Leah. His father was a rabbi, and he had one sibling, a sister, Dena. Like his more-famous older half-brother, Max Factor, he had trained at an early age in haircare, which led to his mob nickname "Jake the Barber". The family emigrated to the United States in 1906. They joined his elder brother, Nathan, in St. Louis, Missouri.

In 1926, Factor perpetrated a massive stock fraud in England that netted $8 million. Some of his victims were members of the British royal family. He subsequently fled to Monaco and executed another major scam, rigging the tables at the Monte Carlo Casino and breaking the bank. He then returned to the United States.

While in the United States, he was tried and sentenced in absentia in England to 24 years in prison. He fought extradition all the way to the U.S. Supreme Court, which heard oral argument on April 18, 1933. Factor faked the kidnapping of his son, Jerome, for the same day. Eight days later, Factor himself and several members of the Chicago Outfit (with whom Factor was associated) claimed to have seen Jerome in a car. They gave chase and freed him, while the kidnappers got away. With Factor allegedly trying to free his son, the Supreme Court held the case over for reargument on October 9. Fearing he would lose the case, Factor had himself "kidnapped" on June 30, 1933. Factor reappeared on July 12, and his family claimed they had given the kidnappers a $50,000 ransom. Factor, working closely with the Chicago Outfit and corrupt local law enforcement, framed local Irish mob boss and Outfit mortal enemy Roger Touhy for the kidnapping.

Factor lost his extradition battle when, on December 4, 1933, the U.S. Supreme Court held in  that Factor should be turned over to British authorities. He was taken into custody on April 17, 1934. Factor's wife, Rella, then asked a U.S. federal district court to dismiss the extradition on the grounds that Factor had been held for longer than the two months permitted for extradition proceedings under U.S. law. The United States Secretary of State, acting on a request by local law enforcement, intervened in the case, asking the court to release Factor because he might be needed as a witness in further legal proceedings against Touhy. The Secretary of State declined to exercise his discretion under the law to toll the case. The 7th Circuit Court of Appeals ordered Factor released and extradition proceedings quashed in 

Factor was convicted of mail fraud in 1942, and served six years of a 10-year sentence.

In 1955, Factor took over the running of the Stardust Hotel on the Las Vegas Strip, allegedly as a front man for the Chicago Outfit. He sold the hotel for $7 million in either 1962 or 1963. It is alleged that when Factor ran the casino, it made between $50–$200 million. He was also involved in an attempt to bail out Jimmy Hoffa from his real-estate related financial problems.

Factor became politically and philanthropically active, and was the largest donor to John F. Kennedy's 1960 presidential campaign. In late 1962, Factor was again scheduled to be deported to the United Kingdom but received a presidential pardon. He became a naturalized American citizen in 1963. He became a major contributor to the gubernatorial campaigns of Pat Brown in California. Brown later called him a close friend.

He lived his later years in Los Angeles, where he made large charitable contributions to enhance the lives of inner city children.

Factor died from a long, undisclosed illness on January 22, 1984, and was interred at the Hollywood Forever Cemetery in Los Angeles.

See also
List of people pardoned or granted clemency by the president of the United States

References

Bibliography

External links

1892 births
1984 deaths
American confidence tricksters
American people of Polish-Jewish descent
British emigrants to the United States
Chicago Outfit mobsters
Depression-era gangsters
Formerly missing people
Jewish American gangsters
People convicted in absentia
Recipients of American presidential pardons
20th-century American Jews